The VI South Pacific Mini Games were held from 3 to 14 December 2001 on Norfolk Island.

Participating countries
There were 18 out of the 22 eligible Pacific nations which participated at the Games.

Sports
Ten sports were contested at the 2001 South Pacific Mini Games:

Final medal table
Medals were awarded in 97 events:

See also
 
Athletics at the 2001 South Pacific Mini Games

References

Sources

External links
 2001 Pacific Mini Games webpage

Pacific Games by year
Sport in Norfolk Island
Pacific Games
P
 
2001 in Norfolk Island
Sports competitions in Norfolk Island
International sports competitions hosted by Australia
Pacific Mini Games